Tamsui Fisherman's Wharf (Chinese: 淡水漁人碼頭站; Pinyin: Dànshuǐ yú rén mǎtóu zhàn) is a light rail station on the Blue Mountain Line (Chinese: 藍海線) of the Danhai light rail, located in Tamsui, New Taipei, Taiwan. It is located next to the Tamsui Fisherman's Wharf, which the station is named after.

Station overview
The station is an at-grade station with an Island platform. It is located near Section 2, Zhongzheng Road.

Station layout

Around the station

 Tamsui Fisherman's Wharf
 Hobe Fort
 Drop of Water Memorial Hall
 New Taipei City Martyrs' Shrine
 Tamsui Customs Wharf
 Fort Santo Domingo

History
Construction of the station started on August 18, 2014 and the station was opened on November 15, 2020.

References

External links
 New Taipei Metro Corporation
 New Taipei City Department of Rapid Transit Systems

Danhai light rail stations
Railway stations opened in 2020